Build Your Own Z80 Computer: design guidelines and application notes  is a book written by Steve Ciarcia, published in 1981 by McGraw-Hill.

The book explains step-by-step the process of building a computer from the ground up, using the Zilog Z80 8-bit Microprocessors, including building a power supply, keyboard, and interfaces to a CRT terminal and tape drive.

References

External links
 Z8.info Support Pages
 Home-Built Z-80 Computer
 Build Your Own Z80 Computer: design guidelines and application notes by archive.org
 Z-80 Space-Time Productions Single Board Computer
 brainwagon » Build Your Own Z80 Computer
 Blake's Conflabatorium | Z80 Microcomputer
 Commodore Free Issue 67
 
 
 

1981 non-fiction books
Computer books
Electronics books
DIY culture
Z80-based home computers